This is a list of Muftis of Eritrea:

 Ibrahim Mukhtar
 Alamin Usman Alamin

Islam in Eritrea
Lists of Eritrean people